The 1947 Green Bay Packers season was their 29th season overall and their 27th season in the National Football League. The team finished with a 6–5–1 record under coach Curly Lambeau, earning a third-place finish in the Western Conference.

Offseason

Draft

Regular season

Schedule

Standings

Roster

Awards, records, and honors

References

 Sportsencyclopedia.com

Green Bay Packers seasons
Green Bay Packers
Green